The George Washington University School of Business (known as GW School of Business or GWSB) is the professional business school of George Washington University in Washington, D.C. The GW School of Business is ranked as one of the top business schools in the United States, with globally ranked undergraduate and graduate programs. GW's campus is also adjacent to some of the world's leading financial institutions, including the Federal Reserve, World Bank, and International Monetary Fund.

U.S. News & World Report ranks GWSB's international business program as 6th best in the world, its healthcare MBA as 16th best, its MBA program as 51st best, and its undergraduate business program as 38th best. The Financial Times ranks GWSB as the 34th best business school in the United States. Among the school's alumni are numerous prominent public and business figures, including Lee Kun-hee (Chairman of the Samsung Group), Faure Gnassingbé (current President of Togo), Ted Lerner (owner of the Washington Nationals), Jerry Reinsdorf (owner of the Chicago Bulls and the Chicago White Sox), Peter Pace, former Chairman of the Joint Chiefs of Staff , and Ina Garten, celebrity chef and author.

History

In 1928, the school was founded on the idea that business and government might become partners in promoting national prosperity and international development. Beginning with a $1 million endowment from The Supreme Council of Scottish Rite Freemasonry Southern Jurisdiction, GW President Cloyd H. Marvin established what was known as the School of Government, with degree programs that integrated business and politics on the national and international levels.

In 1960, the school was renamed the School of Government, Business, and International Affairs. In 1966, President Lloyd H. Elliott split its faculties into a new School of Government and Business Administration (SGBA) and a School of International Affairs—which today bears President Elliott's name. The SGBA was renamed the School of Business and Public Management in 1990. In 2004, it became the School of Business.

Throughout its history, the GW School of Business has attracted leaders from academia, government, and the business world. In 1992, F. David Fowler, a managing partner of KPMG, became dean of the school. He was succeeded in July 1998 by Susan M. Phillips. A former member of the Board of Governors of the Federal Reserve System, Dean Phillips brought to the School her expertise in such specializations as derivatives, bank supervision, and financial management.

Shew as succeeded in August 2010 by Doug Guthrie, whose expertise lies in the fields of leadership and organizational change, corporate governance and corporate social responsibility, and economic reform in China. He was succeeded by Dean Livingstone. During her tenure at GWSB, her research was focused on creativity in business organizations. In April 2017,  Livingstone left GWSB in order to become President of Baylor University, and Vivek Choudhury replaced her as the interim Dean. In July 2018, Anuj Mehrotra became GWSB Dean.

In January 2006, the GW School of Business opened its new unified complex, the Ric and Dawn Duquès Hall, which was newly constructed, and the renovated Norma Lee and Morton Funger Hall.

Academics
The school is currently led by Dean Anuj Mehrotra and supported by a wide-ranging advisory board.

The school consists of various academic departments including: Accountancy, Finance, Information Systems and Technology Management, International Business, Management, Marketing, Strategic Management and Public Policy, Tourism and Hospitality Management, and Decision Sciences.

At the undergraduate level, the school offers three degree programs – Bachelor of Accountancy, Bachelor of Business Administration, and Bachelor of Science in Finance. At the graduate level, the school awards MBA’s, specialized masters, and PhD degrees. GWSB also offers different degrees as fully online programs.

The school offers and has offered various other specialized programs and degrees in the past, like part-time and accelerated (one-year) MBA's, specialized MBA programs for law firms or specialized MBAs for athletes.

The school also offers a Global and Experiential Education program (G&EE), providing students with a range of international study and educational options. Female enrollment at GWSB was over 40% in 2015.

Research
The GW School of Business is home to various research centers and initiatives:

Rankings

Undergraduate programs
 U.S. News & World Report, 38th Undergraduate Business Program, 8th Undergraduate International Business Specialty in 2017
 Princeton Review, "Top Internship Opportunities" 2015 & 2016, No. 1 college or university for internships 
 Business Week, "The Best Undergraduate B-Schools" 2016, 54th in the U.S., 21st in Salary Rank, 47th in Employer Survey
Poets & Quants, 47th for 2020 Best Schools For Business Majors

Graduate programs
Times Higher Education World University Rankings, 28th for 2019 THE/WSJ Business School Report: Two-Year MBA Degrees.
Fortune, 40th for Best MBA Programs in 2021.
Bloomberg Businessweek, 51st for Best B-Schools in 2020–2021.
U.S. News & World Report, 53rd for Full-Time MBA Programs in 2021.
Financial Times, 34th for US Business Schools and 68th globally in 2021.
 The Economist, 27th for US Schools and 45th globally in 2021.
 Military Times, 27th for 2016 Best for Vets Business Schools.
 Business Week, 51st in the U.S and 49th for compensation for "The Best B-School Rankings 2019-20".
Princeton Review, 24th for "Top 25 Graduate Schools for Entrepreneurship" in 2018.
Poets & Quants, 50th for "Top 100 U.S. MBA Programs" in 2021.

Notable people

Many of the school's former students have gone on to distinguished careers in both the private and public sectors. Some notable alumni include Raya Haffar al-Hassan (Finance Minister, Lebanon), Kun-Hee Lee (Chairman of Samsung), Darla Moore (Financier and philanthropist), Pedro Heilbron (CEO of Copa Holdings, S.A.), Colin Powell (former US Secretary of State), Ellen Malcolm (Founder of EMILY's List), Peter Pace (former Chairman of the Joint Chiefs of Staff), Kent Conrad (U.S. Senator from North Dakota), Randall Edwards (Oregon State Treasurer), Shahid Khaqan Abbasi (Prime Minister of Pakistan), Edward M. Liddy (CEO of AIG; former chairman and CEO, Allstate), Ina Garten (Host of Barefoot Contessa), Faure Gnassingbe (President of Togo), Omar Ayub Khan (former Pakistani Minister of State for Finance), Scott Cowen (President of Tulane University), William Dale Montgomery (U.S. Ambassador to Bulgaria, Croatia, and Serbia and Montenegro), and Richard Armour (Director of Information Technology, Dell Computer Corporation).

Notable faculty 
 Herman Aguinis - American researcher and professor of Organizational Behavior and Human Resource Management. Current Avram Tucker Distinguished Scholar and Professor of Management, ranked among the top 96 most influential Economics and Business researchers in the world.
Annamaria Lusardi - Denit Trust Distinguished Scholar and Professor of Economics and Accountancy, who also serves as the Academic Director of the Global Financial Literacy Excellence Center

Notes

External links
 

 
Business schools in Washington, D.C.
Business
Educational institutions established in 1928
1928 establishments in Washington (state)